Bhankodar is a village in Jafarabad Taluka of Amreli district, Gujarat, India. It is situated about eight miles east of Jafarabad, and about a mile from the sea-shore.

History
During British period, around 1831, it was separate tribute-paying taluka. Later it fell under Junagadh State jurisdiction.

References

 This article incorporates text from a publication now in the public domain: 

Villages in Amreli district